The 2nd César Awards ceremony, presented by the Académie des Arts et Techniques du Cinéma, honoured the best French films of 1976 and took place on 19 February 1977 at Salle Pleyel in Paris. The ceremony was chaired by Lino Ventura and hosted by Pierre Tchernia for the second consecutive year. Monsieur Klein won the award for Best Film.

Winners and nominees
The winners are highlighted in bold:

See also
 49th Academy Awards
 30th British Academy Film Awards

References

External links
 Official website
 
 2nd César Awards at AlloCiné

1977
1977 film awards
Cesar